Rajni Perera (born 1985) is a painter and sculptor, known for exploring how power works through the imagery of science fiction. She sees in science fiction a way of combating oppression which she combines with her ideas of revolution and social reform. Perera uses mixed media to actively engage in discussion with the viewing audience about the aesthetic treatment of gender and identity politics.

Biography
Born in Sri Lanka, Perera was raised between her homeland, Australia and Canada. Through British, U.S. and Japanese programming on television in Sri Lanka, she saw the animated Robotech series and the work of Hayao Miyazaki as well as American science fiction, which she viewed as military propaganda. In high school, she saw her first animated science fiction magazines which introduced her to the aesthetics of science fiction. While obtaining a B.F.A. in Drawing & Painting, OCAD University in Toronto, a white settler institution, she began to challenge the canon taught at OCAD and began looking at the style of miniaturist painting as well as her own influences for guidance in exploring the politics of the colored body. She critiques the legacies of exoticism and ethnography through figurative work which combined elements of science fiction, fantasy and magic-realism, as well as Indian miniatures. Some of her later work, particularly The Traveller series (2019), reflects her view of immigrants in the future, as superior and resilient beings. She researches the technology of clothing and emphasizes her painted figure`s adornment and future-wear as protective armour. Dress is a powerful tool to exercise cultural resilence, she feels and adds, "I wouldn`t paint anything I wouldn`t wear in a moment".

Selected exhibitions
Her work has been exhibited at Tramway (Glasgow, 2020); Fondation Phi (Montreal, 2020); the Robert McLaughlin Gallery (Oshawa, 2019); Chromatic Festival (Montreal, 2019); MacKenzie Art Gallery (Regina, 2019) (with Nep Sidhu); the Museum of Contemporary Art (Toronto, 2018); The MAM Rio (Rio de Janeiro, Brazil); Art Metropole (Toronto, 2017); Gallery 44 (Toronto, 2017); the Art Gallery of York University (Toronto, 2017); OTA Fine Arts (Tokyo, Japan 2017); Superchief Gallery (Brooklyn, USA, 2017); the Colombo Art Biennale (Colombo, Sri Lanka, 2016); Art Dubai (Dubai, UAE, 2016); Scope Basel, Scope Miami and the Art League Houston (Houston, USA, 2014); at the McMichael Canadian Art Collection (Kleinburg, Ontario, 2023) and elsewhere. She is represented by Patel-Brown Gallery in Toronto, Galerie Hugues Charbonneau in Montreal, and Saskia Fernando Gallery in Colombo.

Selected videography and illustrations for books
Perera has been shown in videos discussing her work by the Phi Foundation for Contemporary Art (Montreal, 2020), in a video made by the Robert McLaughlin Gallery (Oshawa, 2019) on facebook, in a video by the Art Gallery of Ontario talking about her work in the collection, Fresh Air (Toronto, 2019), and in a video made by CanadianArt Online, In The Studio with Rajni Perera (May 2017).

In 2016, she illustrated a children`s book by Vivek Shrava, The Boy & the Bindi.

Awards
 Medal for Drawing and Painting, OCAD, 2011
 York Wilson Memorial Award, Canada Arts Council, 2019 
 Ontario region finalist for Sobey Art Award, 2021
 MOCA Toronto Award, 2022

Personal life 
Her distinctive artist`s way of dressing has made Vogue magazine and Toronto Life. 
 
She lives and works in Toronto.

References 

21st-century Canadian painters
21st-century Canadian sculptors
1985 births
Living people
Canadian people of Sri Lankan descent
21st-century Sri Lankan painters
OCAD University alumni